Trống quân singing (Hán-Nôm: 𤿰軍, "military drum") is a response folk song of Vietnam. It is often found in festivals and performed as alternating singing between boys and girls. The male and female singer groups make responses to the song through words, instead of counterpoint singing. As such it is less sophisticated and more open to popular participation than Quan họ response singing which requires some degree of musical training. Trống quân songs are often sung by children at village festivals.

References

Vietnamese music